The Konwakiton Glacier is a glacier situated on the southern flank of Mount Shasta, in the U.S. state of California. It is the fifth largest glacier on Mount Shasta, although less than one-third the size of any of the four larger ones (Whitney, Bolam, Hotlum, and Wintun). The Konwakiton is the most frequently visited of Shasta's glaciers, since the standard climbing route up Avalanche Gulch skirts along its western edge above Thumb Rock saddle, with the boot track often only a few feet (about a meter) from the bergschrund at the glacier's head.

In 2002, scientists made the first detailed survey of Mount Shasta's glaciers in 50 years. They found that seven of the glaciers have grown over the period 1951–2002, with the Hotlum and Wintun Glaciers nearly doubling, the Bolam Glacier increasing by half, and the Whitney and Konwakiton Glaciers growing by a third.

See also
List of glaciers in the United States

References

Bill Guyton (2001). Glaciers of California: Modern Glaciers, Ice Age Glaciers, the Origin of the Yosemite Valley, and a Glacier Tour in the Sierra Nevada. University of California Press. .

Glaciers of Siskiyou County, California
Glaciers of California
Glaciers of Mount Shasta